Kimboraga koolanensis is a species of air-breathing land snails, terrestrial pulmonate gastropod mollusks in the family Camaenidae. This species is endemic to Australia.

References

 Slack-Smith, S. 1996.  Kimboraga koolanensis.   2006 IUCN Red List of Threatened Species.   Downloaded on 7 August 2007.

Gastropods of Australia
koolanensis
Vulnerable fauna of Australia
Gastropods described in 1939
Taxonomy articles created by Polbot